William Morris (born July 25, 1957 in Carmel, California, United States) is an American glass artist. He was educated at California State University, Chico, California and Central Washington University, Ellensburg, Washington.

Career

William Morris was first introduced to glass at Pilchuck Glass School, Stanwood, Washington, where he was employed as a bus driver. Early in his career (late 1970s to early 1980s) he was head gaffer for Dale Chihuly. He began making his own work in the 1980s. He relied on the same core team of assistants throughout his career; Karen Willenbrink-Johnsen, Jon Ormbrek, and Randy Walker. Some of the other artists who have worked with his team throughout the years include Blaise Campbell, Ross Richmond, and Trumaine Mason. With the help of Pino signoretto, an Italian glass maestro from Murano, Morris developed new techniques that used oxy/propane torches to spot heat specific sections of a piece allowing for the high level of detail that his work is known for. Morris and his team maintained the William Morris Studio, WA, throughout its duration.

Morris' work is an attempt to add to the archeological record of humankind. Instead of focusing on glass's natural beauty, he uses the medium's ability to transform into wood, bone, fiber, and sinew. He is inspired by ancient civilizations, such as Egyptian, Asian, Native American and Latin American. He also draws inspiration from the wilderness and the relationship between man and animal.

Morris achieved much success during his career and retired in 2007. He is currently represented at Abmeyer + Wood Fine Art in Seattle, WA.

Personal life

William Morris grew up in Carmel, California, United States. Later in life while working as a glass artist, he resided in Washington. During breaks from glass making, he spent time in Idaho's Bitterroot Mountains and Pioneer Mountains and Oregon's Wallowa Mountains and Elkhorn Mountains. After retiring at the age of 49, he now resides in Washington and Hawaii.

Awards 
Artist as Hero Award, National Liberty Museum, Philadelphia, PA 2002
Visionary Award, American Craft Museum, NY 2001
Outstanding Achievement in Glass, UrbanGlass Third Annual Awards Dinner, New York, NY 1997
Distinguished Alumni Award, California State University, Chico, CA 1997
Featured Artist, Chateau Ste. Michelle Winery, Artist Series 1997
National Endowment for the Arts, Individual Artist Grant 1994

External links 
 
2009 Oral History Interview with Mija Riedel for the Archives of American Art
 Abmeyer + Wood - William Morris
 Creative Nature (a documentary film about Morris)
 Myth, Object and the Animal exhibition at the Mint Museum of Craft & Design in Charlotte, NC. Includes techniques and Artist Statement
 The William Morris Archive Show at Abmeyer + Wood
 At Abmeyer + Wood: the wizardry of William Morris
 William Morris' "Native Species" at Bellevue Arts Museum

1957 births
Living people
American glass artists
People from Chico, California
California State University, Chico alumni
People from Carmel-by-the-Sea, California
Fellows of the American Craft Council